Alfred Mason (1837-1895) was an Anglican priest in Australia.

Mason was educated at St Augustine's College, Canterbury. He served incumbencies at New Town, Tasmania and Evandale, Tasmania. He was Archdeacon of Hobart from 1888 until his death.

References

1837 births
Alumni of St Augustine's College, Canterbury
1895 deaths
Anglican archdeacons in Tasmania
19th-century Australian Anglican priests